Valentin Petrovich Zanin (Russian name: Валентин Занин; born 27 October 1937) is a Soviet rower.

Zanin was born in 1937 in Saint Petersburg. At the 1956 European Rowing Championships in Bled, he competed with the coxed four and they won silver. He went to the 1956 Summer Olympics in Melbourne and competed in the coxed four, where they were eliminated in the semi-final. He competed at the 1960 Summer Olympics in Rome with the coxed four where they came fourth.

References

1937 births
Living people
Soviet male rowers
Olympic rowers of the Soviet Union
Rowers at the 1956 Summer Olympics
Rowers at the 1960 Summer Olympics
Rowers from Saint Petersburg
European Rowing Championships medalists